Jeff Wayne's Musical Version of The War of the Worlds is a studio double album by American-born British musician, composer, and record producer Jeff Wayne, released on 9 June 1978 by CBS Records. It is an album musical adapted from the science-fiction novel The War of the Worlds by H. G. Wells in a rock opera style with a rock band, orchestra, narrator, and leitmotifs to carry the story and lyrics that express the feelings of the various characters. The album features guest artists David Essex, Justin Hayward, Phil Lynott, Chris Thompson, and Julie Covington, with actor Richard Burton as the narrator.

The album became a commercial success in the UK, peaking at number 5 on the chart and selling over 2.7 million copies there since its release. In 2018, it was the UK's 32nd best-selling studio album of all time, and has sold an estimated 15 million copies worldwide. It won two Ivor Novello Awards, including one for Wayne and main lyricist Gary Osborne for Best Instrumental or Popular Orchestral Work. Two singles from the album were released; "Forever Autumn", with Hayward on lead vocals, reached number 5 in the UK, followed by the disco-inspired opening track, "The Eve of the War". Wayne's adaptation has spawned multiple versions including video games, DVDs, and live stage shows.

Plot summary

Sides one and two: The Coming of the Martians

In a prologue, the Journalist notes that in the late 19th century few people had even considered the possible existence of extraterrestrial life, yet planet Earth had in fact long been enviously observed by advanced beings.

The Journalist's account begins later that year, with the sighting of several bursts of green gas which, for ten consecutive nights, erupt from the surface of Mars and appear to approach Earth. Ogilvy, an astronomer convinced that no life could exist on Mars, assures the Journalist there is no danger. Eventually, something crashes onto Horsell Common, and in the resulting crater Ogilvy discovers a glowing cylinder, the top of which begins to unscrew. When this lid falls off, a Martian creature emerges. By now a crowd has gathered on the common, and when a group of inquisitive men approaches the cylinder they are incinerated by the Heat-Ray—an advanced Martian weapon. The Journalist flees with the crowd. Later, hammering sounds are heard from the pit. A company of soldiers is deployed at the common, and that evening an injured and exhausted Artilleryman wanders into the Journalist's house and tells him his comrades have been killed by fighting machines—tripod vehicles built and controlled by Martians, each armed with its own Heat-Ray. They set off for London—the Journalist to ensure his lover Carrie is safe, the Artilleryman to report to headquarters—but are soon caught in a crossfire between soldiers and Martians and are separated. Three days later the Journalist arrives at Carrie's house but finds it empty. He resolves to escape London by boat and later catches sight of Carrie aboard a steamer, but the gangplank is raised before he can join her. Fighting machines then approach, threatening the steamer, but they are engaged by the Royal Navy battleship Thunder Child and two are destroyed. The steamer escapes, but Thunder Child and her crew are destroyed by the Martian heat-rays, leaving England defenseless against the invasion.

Sides three and four: The Earth Under the Martians
The wandering Journalist discovers that red weed—the vegetation that gives Mars its color—has taken root on Earth and spread rapidly across the landscape. In a churchyard, he encounters the Parson Nathaniel and his wife Beth. The trio takes refuge in a nearby cottage that is soon surrounded by black smoke—a Martian chemical weapon. Nathaniel, driven mad by his horrific experiences of the Martian attacks, blames himself for the invasion and believes the invaders are demons arising from human evil. As Beth attempts to restore his faith in humanity, a Martian cylinder crashes into the cottage and she is buried under the rubble. The newly arrived Martians construct a handling machine: a squat, spider-like vehicle used to capture and collect humans. After nine days of hiding in the ruins, the Journalist and Nathaniel see the Martians 'eating'—harvesting human blood and injecting it into their own veins. Nathaniel resolves to confront the 'demons', believing that he has been chosen to destroy them with his prayers and holy cross. The Journalist knocks him unconscious to silence his ravings, but the Martians are already alerted. A mechanical claw explores the cottage and drags Nathaniel away. Eventually, the Martians abandon their camp and the Journalist continues his journey to London.
He again encounters the Artilleryman, who is planning a new life underground that would allow humans to evade the Martians and ultimately strike back with reverse-engineered fighting machines. The Journalist, however, realizing the Artilleryman's ambitions far exceed his abilities, soon leaves. Upon reaching London, he finds the city desolate and empty. Driven to suicide by intense despair and loneliness, he surrenders to a fighting machine but realizes it is inert, the Martian inside dead.

In the first epilogue, the Journalist reports that the Martians were defeated by Earth's bacteria—to which they had no resistance—and that, as humanity recovered from the invasion, he was reunited with Carrie. But, he says, the question remains: is Earth now safe, or are the Martians learning from their failures and preparing for a second invasion?

In the second epilogue, set 80 years later, a NASA mission to Mars flounders when the control center from Pasadena loses contact with the unmanned spacecraft. The controller sees a green flare erupt from Mars' surface. The controller tries to contact NASA, but all communication seems to have been blocked. This leaves a question mark of what's going to happen and the fate of the earth, with the possibility of a second Martian invasion.

Character differences from Wells' novel
The Journalist is an amalgam of two of Wells' characters: a writer of speculative philosophy, who narrates much of the novel, and his younger brother who is a medical student and narrates the flight from London and HMS Thunder Child sequences.
Carrie, The Journalist's fiancée, does not exist in the novel, where the narrator has an unnamed wife.
Beth, Parson Nathaniel's wife, also does not exist in the novel.

Production

Background and writing

The album originated when Wayne was touring with singer-songwriter David Essex, for whom he also worked as his producer and musical director. Wayne felt the composing side of his career "had diminished" by this time, and started looking for a story "to get passionate about" and interpret musically, to which his father Jerry suggested the science-fiction novel The War of the Worlds by H. G. Wells. The story instantly caught Wayne's imagination, and he finished the book in a single read. He later said that a musical adaptation of other books were possible, and recalled being impressed by 20,000 Leagues Under the Sea by Jules Verne, The Day of the Triffids by John Wyndham, and Brave New World by Aldous Huxley. However, Wayne went on to read Wells's book "three or four times" and saw the 1953 film adaption, and decided it was the most suitable for a musical adaptation.

In January 1975, Wayne and his father acquired the rights to adapt the work from Wells's estate, which at the time was overseen by Wells's son Frank. Wayne spent three months locating Frank Wells, and found his ideas were well received because it was the first adaptation that stayed true to the story. Wayne was aware of the famous 1938 radio drama adaptation directed and narrated by Orson Welles, but he wanted to stay close to the original story and set his version in Victorian England. From the start Wayne saw his adaptation as an opera, with "story, lemotifs, musical phrases, sounds and compositions that relate to the whole." Wayne started by "organising a cast of characters", while having the book adapted to fit the content of the songs he had outlined for it by Doreen Wayne, his future stepmother who at the time was an established script writer and journalist. Wayne used artistic license to create a love interest by replacing The Journalist's brother for Carrie, his wife. At the same time, Wayne started to write the score and recorded demos in the studio, paying particular attention to how Wells originally wrote the story as a series of episodes with multiple cliff hangers to each chapter. Wayne recalled that he "wanted to have a bit of pressure" applied to the project in January 1976, so he booked studio time at Advision Studios in Fitzrovia, London for May of that year. The idea proved to be a productive for Wayne, who completed a draft of the entire work in six weeks.

The disco influences on "The Eve of the War" was Wayne's intention of wanting the album to be entertaining for people. "The Red Weed" was the most difficult piece for Wayne to compose, and wanted to create "a beautiful melody, and a beautiful dissonance." "Forever Autumn" originated as a jingle for a Lego commercial sung by Gary Osborne and Paul Vigrass. Upon learning that the journalist discovers that his fiancée is missing, Wayne reminded himself of the Lego tune and because it received a positive reception as a commercial, Wayne adapted it into a complete song with lyrics. The piece is the only part of the album that derived from pre-existing material. Wayne lived close to Primrose Hill at the time of writing, which is where the Martians come to their demise in the novel. While walking his dog in the morning he often sat at the top of the hill, which inspired him to envisage what Wells was describing and in turn his score, which was particularly the case for "Dead London". "Epilogue (Part 2)" was influenced by the Viking program, which saw two space probes land on Mars in 1976. It originally featured Wayne sharing the dialogue with his father Jerry, but "the gulf between his performance and mine was too great, so we sacked me!" Effects were applied to Jerry's voice to make it sound more individual.

Casting

Because Wayne wanted to keep his adaptation set in Victorian England, this eliminated the possibility of hiring American people in the main cast. In the early stages, he realised the importance of finding the right person to narrate the story, and actor Richard Burton was at the top of "a very short list" of candidates, and compared his voice to a musical instrument. Upon learning that Burton was in a production of the play Equus in New York City, Wayne delivered a letter with a copy of the album's script to the stage doorman and hoped for him to read it. After two or three days, Burton agreed to take part. Burton had already committed to start work on Exorcist II: The Heretic (1977) in Los Angeles after the Equus run, so Wayne organised to record the narration there to avoid further delays. Burton originally signed on for five days of recording for a maximum of 12 hours for each, but he finished his parts in just one except for an additional three-hour session held several months after for what Wayne described as "some repair work". Essex, who was present at the recording session, said that Burton insisted to narrate without hearing the music, which became "a bit of a nuisance" since Wayne and he had recorded their shared vocals in time with the background tracks. "So we had to do it wild."

It was important for Wayne that the different voices on the album sounded "convincing and believable". Having become a good friend of Wayne's, David Essex is the voice of the artilleryman. He had previously starred in a production of the musical Godspell, which also featured Julie Covington, who subsequently met Wayne and agreed to voice Beth. Although Wayne had not previously met the other voice actors: Thin Lizzy frontman Phil Lynott as Parson Nathaniel, Moody Blues vocalist Justin Hayward singing the Journalist's thoughts, and Manfred Mann's Earth Band guitarist and vocalist Chris Thompson as the Voice of Humanity, he was "thrilled" that they took part "because they each brought their own sort of magic, their style and performance and singing." Wayne had to convince the guest artists that they were the right performers for their role, and got them keen to carry out their parts. Wayne thought Hayward was the right singer for "Forever Autumn" and sent him a demo with the invitation to participate, but Hayward was unconvinced. He changed his mind when a "young lad" and employee of The Moody Blues' record shop in Cobham, heard the demo and told Hayward it was an ideal song for him. Lynott was on a Canadian tour with Thin Lizzy when it was time to record his parts, so Wayne organised for his vocals recorded there.

Initially Wayne had Carlos Santana record guitar riffs and hooks to interpret the Martian's heat-ray, but his involvement ended after one day when Santana's manager spotted an issue in the contract and certain requests could not be met. The role of Parson Nathaniel was originally given to Free and Bad Company singer Paul Rodgers, and although Wayne thought he delivered "fantastic" vocals, Rodgers was reluctant to take on the speaking part and dropped out. Wayne has these early recordings on his original multitrack tapes, but has no interest in releasing them. The Who frontman Roger Daltrey was to also make an appearance.

Recording and finalising CBS deal
The album was recorded at Advision from 18 May 1976 to 30 June 1977. Wayne is credited as the album's sole producer, with Geoff Young as recording engineer with Laurence Diana assisting. The album was one of the first recorded on 48-track, which was achieved by Maglink, a prototype system that allowed the synchronisation of two 24-track Studer A80 machines with a SMPTE timecode reserved on two of the available 48 tracks. Wayne recalled that Maglink malfunctioned often and the lack of expertise to fix problems resulted in delays in recording. When recording finished, 77 reels of multitrack tapes had been used. Soon after mixing was complete, the tape operator accidentally slashed through the tape containing side four as he thought it was a reel of unwanted outtakes. Wayne was subsequently offered free studio time to produce another mix. Wayne's initial version of the work was a little over two hours, which had to be refined in order to fit four sides of a vinyl record. The final version runs at 95 minutes. The album's packaging includes a 16-page colour booklet with artwork and a synopsis of the tracks.

The album features Ken Freeman on synthesisers, who started with a Minimoog and ARP Odyssey. Later in production, a Yamaha CS-80 was brought in which was used to re-record various overdubs, including the horns. Among the synthesisers used was the Thunderchild SZ3540, a custom made monophonic model built by JWM Electronics after Wayne sought for a fatter, bassy sound. Wayne wanted to create the Martian's "ooll-la" sound of their heat-rays with a synthesiser, but he could only create sounds that resemble "ooo" and "ahhh", not the "l". The final effect was achieved with a multitrack "voicebox guitar effect" devised and voiced by Jo Partridge, who plays guitar on the album and made the sound "as dramatic as possible." All but one of the foley sound effects heard on the record were created by Wayne's wife Geraldine. Wayne said the one that he is asked about the most is the sound of the cylinder unscrewing when the Martians emerge from their spaceship, which he achieved by turning and scraping two kitchen saucepans together that Young then amplified and captured in stereo. Most of the musicians on the album had also played on Essex's debut studio album Rock On (1973). Wayne wrote out the various parts of the score for the band, which was performed live in the studio without any click tracks, leaving the group "to groove together, and then move onto the next tune." It took one week to record almost an entire side of the album. The string section consisted of violins, violas, cellos, and double basses, totalling 50 players and led by violinist Patrick Halling. It was recorded in the course of two evenings at Abbey Road Studios.

Wayne's original budget estimate for the album was £34,500. Later he secured a £70,000 recording deal with Dick Asher of CBS Records during an American tour with Essex. Initially the deal involved a single album of "thematic pieces" and without any guest artists, but his idea for the album had grown to produce a full-scale musical adaptation of Wells's novel which could not fit on one record, and the idea expanded into a double album with CBS agreeing to fund an additional £34,500 and cover a part of Burton's fees. Although his contract with CBS did not guarantee a public release, Wayne consulted his wife and parents who encouraged him to continue and finish the album despite the substantial costs involved in its production. When the album was finished, its cost totalled £240,000, half of which was paid by CBS. Wayne was "too chicken" to deliver the finished product to CBS himself, so he had his future wife Geraldine, then an assistant to the label's business affairs director, to hand it in. After reviewing the album for thirty days, CBS praised its strong story, songs, guest artists, and uniqueness, but doubted if people were willing to listen to a double album of continuous material, and believed its chance of success would suffer with Wayne, an American, producing an adaptation of an English novel. However, the label was unaware that Wayne had also produced an alternate version of the album with the songs reduced to three or four minutes and with new introductions and endings, making it easier to get the album on the radio. Wayne agreed to give CBS another month to decide, after which its UK division gave it the green-light for release.

Artwork
Wayne originally commissioned Roger Dean, best known for his work for the progressive rock band Yes, to produce the artwork for the album. After Dean produced some designs, Wayne felt the work did not quite fit for what he had in mind, and proceeded to look elsewhere. He approached John Pasche, who went on to design the logo on the front cover, and direct the overall design of the record's sleeve which features paintings from three artists: Geoff Taylor, Mike Trim, and Peter Goodfellow. Dean adapted his unused designs for the album for the packaging of the 1987 shooting video game Terrorpods.

Release
The album premiered at a launch party at the London Planetarium on 1 June 1978, and featured a playback accompanied by a laser show. The event was attended by over 500 people. The album was released on 9 June; four weeks later, Wayne said he was able to repay CBS its share of the album's costs due to strong sales. In September 1978, the album reached its peak position of No. 5 on the UK Albums Chart, during a 20-week stay in the top ten. It has since been in the UK top 100 albums for 240 weeks, and has sold over 2.7 million copies in the country. In 2018, it was the UK's 32nd best-selling studio album of all time. Elsewhere, it charted in 22 countries and reached number one in 11 of them including Australia, where it was top for seven weeks. In April 1979, the album exceeded platinum status in the Netherlands, New Zealand, and Australia, and gold certification in Canada, Spain, Israel, and Belgium. The album has earned gold and platinum and multi-platinum sales certifications in 17 countries. The album has sold an estimated 15 million copies worldwide.

The album spawned two singles. On 2 June 1978, an edited version of "Forever Autumn" was released which went to No. 5 on the UK Singles Chart. This was followed by "The Eve of the War", released in September 1978. Some of the North American and European pressings featured new lead vocals from Thompson. In 1979, a seven-minute disco remix of "The Eve of the War" was released.

The album won two Ivor Novello Awards, including one for Wayne and Osborne for Best Instrumental or Popular Orchestral Work. In 1979, the album was named Best Recording in Science Fiction and Fantasy, in a panel of judges that included George Lucas, Steven Spielberg, and Alfred Hitchcock.

Reception

The album had a positive review in Record Mirror, with review Bev Briggs declaring it as "four sides of sheer excellence" and after reading the novel and feature film, the album is "the most easily stomachable of the lot." She praised the music, ideas, script, and voices, all of which complement each other, but thought the continuous, 95-minute structure forces the listener to digest it straight through. A positive review was published by Ben Ostrander in the science-fiction magazine The Space Gamer, who thought the album was "magnificent" and despite some differences between the record and the original novel, it "is a kind of rock/radio play with modern interpretations" and is "better than most crap on TV, and makes for a fun evening around the stereo." Music Week commented that the album is "superb" and predicted it will become "one of the biggest sellers."

In 2020, writing for Prog, Alex Burrows described the record as "the ultimate concept album and best-selling prog soundtrack of all time", concluding "it's still an album that certainly ticks all the boxes of the true definition of 'progressive': groundbreaking, cutting-edge and seminal."

Reissues and other versions
Wayne's alternate version of the album with the songs edited for radio airplay was distributed to stations to promote the original concept album. It became a success in its own right, prompting Wayne to prepare a full commercial release. The set, entitled Highlights from Jeff Wayne's Musical Version of The War of the Worlds, was released in 1981 by Columbia Records.

In addition to English, the album has been released in Spanish and German. The first Spanish edition featured Anthony Quinn re-recording the Journalist's narration and other dialogue originally voiced by Essex, Covington, and Lynott. The songs and the background music were not altered. Following its release in November 1978, Wayne had to re-do the album because Quinn's script was in Mexican Spanish and not Peninsular Spanish. The second edition features narration by Teófilo Martínez, and released in 1979. Wayne found it amusing as the Spanish division of CBS had recommended him to use Quinn for the role. A German album followed in 1981 featuring Curd Jürgens as the Journalist, plus radio broadcasts in Dutch and Israeli. Although plans for versions in Japanese, Russian, French, and Italian were planned, none of them came into fruition.

A 1989 version of "The Eve of the War" remixed by Ben Liebrand reached number 3 in the UK singles chart.

A 1995 edition of the album featured additional remixes of some tracks and additional conceptual art. On 23 June 2005 the original album was re-released in two forms: one in a remastered 2-disc hybrid multichannel Super Audio CD set; another in a 7-disc "Collector's Edition" featuring additional remixes, outtakes, the actors reading from the unabridged script, excerpts from the Quinn and Jürgens performances, as well as a seventh disc being a DVD showing the making of the album, produced by Phoenix Film & Television Productions. This release went to No. 7 in the UK.

In 2000, a collection of remixes of tracks from the original album—including several used in the 1998 computer game—were released on a double CD titled The War of the Worlds: ULLAdubULLA—the Remix Album. While most of the contributors are relatively unknown, the album includes two versions of a remix of "Dead London" by Apollo 440 and other remixes by house-music pioneer Todd Terry. Following the success of the 2005 re-release of the original album, ULLAdubULLA II was released on 17 April 2006. This single CD release was largely made of tracks from the original remix album, with some additional new remixes by Tom Middleton and DJ Keltech, and hip-hop versions of two tracks by DJ Zube. Middleton's remixes of "The Eve of the War" were also released on CD and vinyl.

In other media

Video games
In 1984 CRL Group PLC released Jeff Wayne's Video Game Version of The War of the Worlds for the Sinclair ZX Spectrum home computer. It was also released in Germany as Jeff Wayne's Video Version von Der Krieg der Welten.

In 1998, a real-time strategy game, Jeff Wayne's The War of the Worlds, was created by Rage Software and released for the personal computer. Jeff Wayne himself produced the musical arrangements for the game, consisting of 45 minutes of material re-scored and remixed in a newer electronica style with techno beats. The game's artwork was based on the Michael Trim, Geoff Taylor and Peter Goodfellow illustrations found throughout the original album booklet, and some of Richard Burton's dialogue as the journalist is used in the opening and closing scenes. Nigel Hawthorne and Lewis MacLeod voiced the human and Martian generals respectively.

In 1999, a third-person shooter, also entitled Jeff Wayne's The War of the Worlds, was developed by Pixelogic and released for the Sony PlayStation. It used much of the 1998 game's music and graphical elements, but featured an entirely different campaign with a focus on vehicular combat.

Animated film
In late 2004 the ULLAdubULLA II production had been commissioned for an animated CGI film version. Test footage of some Martian machines was released, but the film itself never materialised.

Tours

2006–2007

In September 1978, Wayne had entered negotiations with Paramount Pictures over the film rights and with two concert producers, one of which being Showco, to present a live stage version of the album. The idea came to nothing, and it took Wayne until 2006 to stage a concert tour of the album.

The tour finally began in the UK and Ireland in April 2006, and featured Wayne conducting the 48-piece ULLAdubULLA Strings and 10-piece Black Smoke Band. A "virtual" Richard Burton (a large bust of the Journalist onto which was projected an image of a young Burton with a super-imposed actor's mouth and jaw lip synched to the original Burton recordings) performed as The Journalist. Hayward reprised his original role as The Sung Thoughts of the Journalist and Thompson returned as The Voice of Humanity. Also from the original recording were Spedding playing lead guitar and Flowers on bass guitar. Other guest artists who appeared were the "People's Tenor" Russell Watson as Parson Nathaniel, Alexis James as The Artilleryman, and Tara Blaise as Beth. Daniel Boys was understudy for all the roles sung by male artists and performed as Parson Nathaniel for the limited-ticket dress rehearsal on 12 April 2006 (as it was later discovered that Watson was experiencing medical issues). A model Fighting Machine featured on stage. A short animated prequel to the story was also presented in the style of the upcoming feature-length film detailing the Martians' ecological destruction of their own world (which was originally made for the 1998 computer game) and their preparations to invade Earth, and including a short remix of "The Red Weed". The show was produced by Wayne, Ray Jones, and Damian Collier.

The tour visited Australia and New Zealand in 2007; the former leg featured Australian Idol runner-up Shannon Noll as Parson Nathaniel, actress Rachael Beck as Beth, and Michael Falzon as the Artilleryman, alongside Hayward, Thompson, Spedding and Flowers in the band. A further UK live tour took place in December 2007 with Justin Hayward, Chris Thompson, Alexis James, John Payne as Parson, and Sinéad Quinn as Beth.

2009–2011
2008 marked the 30th anniversary of the original album release and a number of events took place, including a "30th Anniversary Tour" which started on 7 June 2009 in Dublin. The 30th anniversary saw Hayward, James and Thompson reprise their respective roles, with Noll taking the role of Parson Nathaniel and Jennifer Ellison as Beth. When Noll had to leave the show halfway through its 2009 tour, the role of Parson Nathaniel went to Damien Edwards, who completed the run. The virtual Burton was also improved; the whole face was animated (an actor was found with a similar facial structure, all of Burton's narrative parts were mimed, and his face was superimposed onto the face of the actor). In 2010 and 2011, live dates took place in the UK, Ireland, Germany, the Netherlands and Belgium. Hayward and Thompson reprised their roles as The Sung Thoughts of the Journalist and The Voice of Humanity respectively, with Rhydian Roberts as Parson Nathaniel, Jason Donovan as The Artilleryman, and Liz McClarnon as Beth.

2014 Final Arena Tour 
In November 2013, it was confirmed that Jeff Wayne's Musical Version of The War of the Worlds – The New Generation would tour arenas again in late November through December 2014 for The Final Arena Tour.[23] Tickets went on sale 22 November 2013. The tour took place across the UK and the Netherlands, beginning in Sheffield on 27 November 2014 and coming to a close on 16 December 2014 in Amsterdam. Three of the guest performers were confirmed at the time of the tour announcement. Westlife's Brian McFadden played the role of the Sung Thoughts of the Journalist (played by Martin on the previous tour), Les Misérables' Carrie Hope Fletcher played Beth (Played by Kerry Ellis on the 2012 tour), and Jason Donovan reprised his role of Parson Nathaniel. At the time, Jeff Wayne also announced that another guest had been confirmed but was yet to be announced. Later announcements confirmed Shayne Ward as the Artilleryman, Joseph Whelan as the Voice of Humanity, and Jonathan Vickers as the NASA Controller (the voice of the NASA Controller for this production was voiced by Jerry Wayne). Other changes included adding the character of Carrie's Father (actor Nigel Barber) and lyrics to the song Life Begins Again.

Later in the year, the final guest was announced as actor Callum O'Neill, who portrayed H.G. Wells on stage in three separate stages of his life. After the William Rowland and Vera May prologue was moved into a pre-show (with the characters performing among the audience rather than on stage), O'Neill appeared in a new prologue as a 33-year-old Wells, opening the show with a speech about 19th century England during the dying moments of 1899. He introduces himself and his work on The War of the Worlds before the on-screen introduction of the Martians. Later, just before Act II begins, O'Neill appears again as a 53-year-old Wells, discussing the end of World War I and speaking about the destructive capabilities of humankind. O'Neill appears a final time at the end of the show, just before the NASA epilogue, this time as a 79-year-old Wells, elderly and in a wheelchair. Set just after the end of World War II, he is dying, but now speaks about the extent of atrocities committed during the recent war, how human beings can, in some shapes and forms, be as destructive as the Martians had been in his novel.

The Final Arena Tour ended on 16 December 2014 in Amsterdam. Speaking about the last show, Jeff Wayne said, "Bringing The War of the Worlds to life in many of the world's finest arenas has been the most amazing experience for me over the last seven years. We've achieved more than we ever thought was possible both musically and technologically. However, the time is right to take The War of the Worlds in new directions after the 2014 tour."

2018 40th Anniversary Tour 
In early 2018, Jeff Wayne announced that The War of The Worlds would be touring again with a special limited two month UK Tour celebrating the album's 40th Anniversary. A new setup of staging, choreography, costumes and cast of actors were introduced. Liam Neeson's narration and holography was once again used in the show. The show starred Newton Faulker as the Sung Thoughts of the Journalist, Adam Garcia as the Artilleryman, Anna-Marie Wayne as Carrie, Inglorious' Nathan James as The Voice of Humanity, Jason Donovan as Parson Nathaniel, Carrie Hope Fletcher as Beth, Lily Osborne as Vera May, and Jonathan Vickers as the NASA Controller. The new song for the 40th Anniversary Tour, which was first seen in the 2016 West End production, was a reprise of "Forever Autumn". This was performed by both Anna-Marie Wayne and Newton Faulker as their respective characters at the beginning of Act II.

The cast of players for the 40th Anniversary tour received critical acclaim, with many praising the acting, singing and chemistry between Jason Donovan and Carrie Hope Fletcher during "The Spirit of Man". Nathan James' performance as the Voice of Humanity also received praise and the inclusion of Anna-Marie Wayne as Carrie was also acclaimed.

2021–2022 Life Begins Again Tour 
2021 marks the 15th anniversary of the original 2006 staging: a tour in March/April 2021. The press release state that 'new features for the 2021 tour include the giant arched bridge now running from the lip of the stage out over the audience to the front of house desk, three panoramic screens with two hours of cutting edge CGI and other content. Prepare for big and bold lighting, pyrotechnics and other-worldly special effects as well as ground-breaking levitation effect.' Also the inclusion of 'the incineration of a cast member in full view of the audience' and 'the release of deadly Black Smoke from the Martian Fighting Machine.' Most notably, this tour has been marketed with this comparison to its original 2006 counterpart: 'In 2006 TWOTW was already considered a cutting-edge production with six trucks filled to the brim. But in 2021, which marks a momentous 15 years of live touring, the production be up to 12 trucks, and with it, a host of ingredients and special effects that will challenge and excite the senses'.

Performers
 Richard Burton – spoken words (The Journalist) (via a "virtual" Richard Burton: a large bust of the Journalist plus a projected image)
 Liam Neeson – spoken words (The Journalist) (The New Generation 2012, 2014, the Dominion Theatre stage production 2016, 2018 40th Anniversary Tour)
 Justin Hayward – vocals (The Sung Thoughts of the Journalist) (all tours: 2006, 2007 Australian, 2007 UK, 2009 30th Anniversary,2010, 2022 Life Begins Again tour)
 Michael Praed – vocals (The Sung Thoughts of the Journalist): Dominion Theatre 2016
 Alexis James – spoken words and vocals (The Artilleryman) (2006, 2007 UK, and 2009 30th Anniversary tour)
 Michael Falzon – spoken words and vocals (The Artilleryman) (2007 Australian tour)
 Jason Donovan – spoken words and vocals (The Artilleryman, 2010 tour & Parson Nathaniel, 2012, 2014, 2018 40th Anniversary tour)
 Ricky Wilson - spoken words and vocals ( The Artilleryman) 2012 The New Generation 
 Chris Thompson – vocals (The Voice of Humanity) (all tours: 2006, 2007 Australian, 2007 UK, 2009 30th Anniversary, and 2010 tour)
 Russell Watson – spoken words and vocals (Parson Nathaniel) (2006 tour)
 Shannon Noll – spoken words and vocals (Parson Nathaniel) (2007 Australian and first half of 2009 30th Anniversary tour)
 John Payne – spoken words and vocals (Parson Nathaniel) (2007 UK tour)
 Damien Edwards – spoken words and vocals (Parson Nathaniel) (second half of 2009 30th Anniversary tour)
 Rhydian Roberts – spoken words and vocals (Parson Nathaniel) (2010 tour)
 Tara Blaise – spoken words and vocals (Beth) (2006 tour)
 Rachael Beck – spoken words and vocals (Beth) (2007 Australian tour)
 Sinéad Quinn – spoken words and vocals (Beth) (2007 UK tour)
 Jennifer Ellison – spoken words and vocals (Beth) (2009 30th Anniversary tour)
 Liz McClarnon – spoken words and vocals (Beth) (2010 tour)
 Carrie Hope Fletcher – spoken words and vocals (Beth) (2014 and 2018 40th anniversary tour)
Callum O'Neill – spoken words (HG Wells) (2014 tour, and 2022 Life Begins Again Tour)
Adam Garcia – spoken words and vocals (The Artilleryman) (2018 40th Anniversary tour)
Newton Faulkner – vocals (The Sung Thoughts of The Journalist) (2018 40th Anniversary tour)
Nathan James – vocals (The Voice of Humanity) (2018 40th Anniversary tour, 2022 Life Begins Again Tour)
 Lewis MacLeod – spoken words (The Voice of the Martians) (2006-2010)
 Daniel Boys – spoken words and vocals (Male Understudy) (2006, 2007 Australian, 2007 UK, 2009 30th Anniversary, and 2010 tour)
 Jonathan Vickers – spoken words and vocals (NASA Controller) (2014, 2018 40th anniversary tour, 2022 Life Begins Again Tour)
 Lily Osborne (Female Understudy)
 Claire Richards - spoken words and vocals (Beth) (2022 Life Begins Again Tour).
 Duncan James - spoken words and vocals (Parson Nathaniel) (2022 Life Begins Again Tour).
 Kevin Clifton - spoken words and vocals (The Artilleryman) (2022 Life Begins Again Tour).
Stephanie Aves (2022 Life Begins Again Tour)

Black Smoke Band 2022 (current)
 Jeff Wayne – composer, conductor
 Olivia Jageurs - harp, percussion
 Accy Yeats – drums
 Pete Hunt - bass
 Thomas Gandey – keyboards, synthesisers
 Neil Angilley – keyboards
 Chris Spedding – electric guitar, acoustic guitar
 Laurie Wisefield – guitars, mandolin, autoharp, tar
 Paul Bond - electric guitar, acoustic guitar, keyboards, backing vocals
ULLAdubULLA Orchestra

Black Smoke Band (previous members)
 Herbie Flowers – bass guitar
 Huw Davies – Electric Guitar
 Hugh Burns - Acoustic Guitar
 Gaetan Schurrer – Tar, Keyboards
 Tom Woodstock – guitars, keyboards, backing vocals
 Gordy Marshall – drums
 Julia Thornton – percussion, harp, keyboards
 Steve Turner – keyboards
 Kennedy Aitchison – keyboards
 Colin Good - keyboards
 Ian Wherry - keyboards

DVD
A two disc Region 2 DVD of the 2006 Wembley Arena, London show was released 6 November 2006 by Universal. Disc 1 contains the live show and Disc 2 contains extras and a documentary of the making of the live show. It is titled Jeff Wayne's Musical Version of The War of The Worlds – Live on Stage.

The New Generation
In 2011, Wayne held a press conference in London to announce the release of a new version of the original album, titled Jeff Wayne's Musical Version of The War of the Worlds – The New Generation. Wayne explained that the idea was to return to the original album and explore the characters in more detail, and develop the love story between Herbert and his fiancée Carrie. The project also gave Wayne the opportunity to re-interpret his compositions with contemporary production techniques. The cast features actor Liam Neeson as the Narrator and Kaiser Chiefs frontman Ricky Wilson as the Artilleryman. The album was released in November 2012 by Sony Music Entertainment, and peaked at No. 13 in the UK chart. It was supported by an arena tour, followed by a stage show adaptation, running at the Dominion Theatre in London's West End from February to April 2016.

The Musical Drama
On 15 October 2018 it was announced on the Jeff Wayne's Musical Version of The War of the Worlds Official Twitter page and on the official website that after over a year in work, a brand new production of Jeff Wayne's The War of The Worlds: The Musical Drama will be available on Audible.com on 29 November 2018. This is a brand new 5-hour Audible Original Production based upon Jeff's Musical Version and HG Wells’ dark Victorian tale featuring new story and musical content. It will feature an all-star cast including Michael Sheen as The Journalist, Taron Egerton as The Artilleryman, Ade Edmondson as Ogilvy, Theo James as Parson Nathaniel, with Anna Marie Wayne as Carrie, The Journalist's wife.

Jeff Wayne's The War of The Worlds: The Immersive Experience
In May 2019, an immersive experience named Jeff Wayne's The War of The Worlds: The Immersive Experience opened to the public in London. Set across 22,000 sq. ft of space, the 2-hour experience combines music from the album, immersive theatre, virtual reality, 5-D effects, holograms, and other technological features to put visitors in at the scene of the Martian invasion across 24 scenes. The cast includes Tom Brittney, Anna-Marie Wayne, Carrie Hope Fletcher, and David Burnett, who are joined by a live cast of 12 actors.

Track listing
All music by Jeff Wayne, and all tracks feature narration by Richard Burton.
All lyrics by Jeff Wayne, Paul Vigrass, and Gary Osborne unless specified below, with script by Doreen Wayne.

Personnel
Credits adapted from the 1978 LP and 2005 CD liner notes.

The Players
 Richard Burton – George Herbert, The Journalist
 Justin Hayward – The Sung Thoughts of The Journalist
 David Essex – The Artilleryman
 Chris Thompson – The Voice of Humanity
 Phil Lynott – Parson Nathaniel
 Julie Covington – Beth (Parson Nathaniel's wife)
 Jo Partridge – The Heat Ray
 Jerry Wayne – The Voices of NASA

The Musicians
 Chris Spedding – guitars
 Jo Partridge – guitars, mandolin
 Herbie Flowers – bass guitar
 Barry Morgan – drums
 Barry de Souza – percussion
 Roy Jones – percussion
 Ray Cooper – percussion
 Ken "Prof" Freeman – synthesisers, organ, electric piano
 Jeff Wayne – piano, jangle piano, harpsichord, conductor
 Paul Hart – piano on "The Red Weed"
 George Fenton – tar, santoor, zither
 Billy Lawrie – backing vocals
 Gary Osborne – backing vocals
 Chris Thompson – backing vocals
 Paul Vigrass – backing vocals
 Geraldine "Pest" Wayne – sound effects

Production
 Jeff Wayne – composer, orchestrator, producer
 Jerry Wayne – director of "dramatic and narrative sections"
 Doreen Wayne – script
 Charles Dubin – director of "dramatic and narrative sections"
 John Pasche – art direction, logo design
 Geoff Taylor – painting
 Mike Trim – painting, pencil sketches
 Peter Goodfellow – painting
 Denis "BilBo" Blackham – lacquer cut on side one
 Geoff Young – recording
 Laurence Diana – recording assistant
 Bill Foster – mastering at Tape One, London

Charts

Weekly charts

Year-end charts

Certifications

References

Bibliography
 
 Miller, Thomas Kent. Mars in the Movies: A History. Jefferson, North Carolina: McFarland & Company, 2016. .

External links

 
 

1978 debut albums
Alien invasions in music
Columbia Records albums
Concept albums
Jeff Wayne albums
Music based on novels
Music based on science fiction works
Rock musicals
Rock operas
Science fiction concept albums
Science fiction musicals
Works based on The War of the Worlds